Petar Premović (born September 12, 1994) is a Serbian volleyball player, a member of the Indonesian club Jakarta BNI 46.

Sporting achievements

Clubs 
Bulgarian Super Cup:
  2022/2023
UAE Vice Presidents Cup:
  2021/2022
Emperor's Cup:
  2020/2021
Champion of Serbia:
  2017
  2016
  2012, 2013
Serbian Super Cup:
  2015

References

External links
 FCTokyo profile
 LegaVolley profile
 Volleybox profile
 CEV profile
 OlimpicSports profile

1994 births
Living people
People from Raška, Serbia
Serbian men's volleyball players
Expatriate volleyball players in Italy
Expatriate volleyball players in Japan
Serbian expatriate sportspeople in Italy
Serbian expatriate sportspeople in Japan